Jasurbek Latipov is an Uzbekistani boxer, born in Andijan. At the 2012 Summer Olympics, he competed in the Men's flyweight, but was defeated in the third round.  In the 2013 World Amateur Championships, he reached the final, where he lost to Mikhail Aloyan.  In 2017, he reached the final again, this time losing the Cuban boxer, Yosbany Veitia.  That year, he also won the Asian Championships, beating In Kyu Kim in the final.  In 2018, he won the Flyweight division at the Asian Games, beating Rogen Ladon.

References

1991 births
Living people
Uzbekistani male boxers
Flyweight boxers
Boxers at the 2012 Summer Olympics
Olympic boxers of Uzbekistan
AIBA World Boxing Championships medalists
Universiade medalists in boxing
Boxers at the 2010 Asian Games
Boxers at the 2018 Asian Games
Asian Games gold medalists for Uzbekistan
Asian Games medalists in boxing
Medalists at the 2018 Asian Games
Universiade bronze medalists for Uzbekistan
Medalists at the 2013 Summer Universiade

People from Andijan
21st-century Uzbekistani people